Grand Canyon Village Historic District comprises the historic center of Grand Canyon Village, on the South Rim of the Grand Canyon in Grand Canyon National Park, Arizona.  The district includes numerous landmark park structures, many of which are National Historic Landmarks themselves, or are listed on the National Register of Historic Places.  The town design as a whole is also significant for its attention to integration with the Grand Canyon landscape, its incorporation of National Park Service Rustic design elements, and for the idiosyncratic design of park concessioner structures such as the El Tovar Hotel.

Design and history
Grand Canyon Village was planned by the National Park Service to be a comprehensive development for tourism on the South Rim. It is the largest example of Park Service town planning extant in the national park system. Initially centered on the terminus of the Grand Canyon Railway, the village expanded as both the Park Service and the park concessioner, the Fred Harvey Company, built or expanded facilities. Initial development was centered on the El Tovar Hotel and the Bright Angel Lodge, both concessioner-operated facilities. The El Tovar was opened in 1905 as a destination hotel on the canyon rim by the Atchison, Topeka and Santa Fe Railway, who owned the Grand Canyon spur. A new train depot was built next to the hotel by the railway in 1909. Nearly all early development at the village was undertaken by concessioners.

In 1910, while the Grand Canyon was still designated a national monument, Secretary of the Interior Richard A. Ballinger suggested that a plan be established before further development took place at the South Rim. Mark Daniels, the general superintendent of the parks from 1914, called for similar comprehensive planning to establish water and sewer systems, power distribution and telephone networks. A 1924 master plan by National Park Service landscape architect Daniel Ray Hull established a "village square" at the intersection of the railroad and east road just below the El Tovar. The first park administration building was established there. Hull used the local topography, dictated by Bright Angel Wash valley's topography, with residential neighborhoods on two small hills divided by a branch of the Bright Angel drainage, away from the main south entrance road down Bright Angel and keeping hotel development in the area of the Bright Angel Camp and the El Tovar. Another square or plaza was intended where the new south entrance road approached the rim, surrounded by another administration building, a post office, and a proposed museum. Over time, the plaza became a parking area. Treatment of residential areas varied, including use of bungalows.  Park Service housing was arranged so that automobile access was to the rear, with the house fronts oriented to a central communal space.  Grand Canyon Village is one of the earliest uses of this arrangement in a planned community, predating its use at Radburn, New Jersey by Clarence Stein and Henry Wright. Housing for Fred Harvey Company personnel was arranged in a more traditional street-facing arrangement, with a parallel system of alleys for access to garages at the rear of the lots.

Much of the work that was accomplished in the late 1930s was done by Civilian Conservation Corps labor, particularly the landscaping, which involved the transplantation of native vegetation into areas that had been disturbed by construction.

Contributing structures
Many of the contributing features and structures in Grand Canyon Village are simple landscape structures such as sidewalks, retaining walls and culverts. The canyon rim stone wall is the principle defining feature of the area, constructed in stages between 1905 and 1934. 44 such structures have been identified as contributing features, mostly built of local Kaibab limestone.

The district includes a number of significant structures, some of them National Historic Landmarks in their own right, with several others individually listed on the National Register of Historic Places. The buildings can be divided into two categories: the fanciful structures built by park concessioners, many of which were designed by Mary Colter, and the more restrained examples of National Park Service Rustic architecture designed by Hull and Thomas Chalmers Vint for park administration and housing. Concessioner structures include:
 The El Tovar Hotel (1905) was built by the AT&SF as a resort hotel on the canyon's rim. Designed by architect Charles Frederick Whittlesey, the hotel is a National Historic Landmark.
 The Bright Angel Lodge (1935) incorporates the Buckey O'Neill Cabin and the Red Horse Station, relocated to the site. Formerly the Bright Angel Hotel, the facility was almost entirely rebuilt under the direction of architect Mary Colter.  According to the 1996-dated National Historic Landmark District nomination, Bright Angel Hotel was not included in the original 1975 registration of the Grand Canyon Village Historic District as it was not then 50 years old, but the historic district was expanded in 1982 to include it. 
 The Buckey O'Neill Cabin (1897) is the oldest structure at the South Rim, individually listed on the NRHP.
 The Lookout Studio (1914) is just to the west of the Bright Angel Lodge. Designed by Colter, the structure was originally known as "The Lookout," which is its primary purpose.  The structure includes a small gift shop. It is part of the Mary Jane Colter buildings National Historic Landmark.
 Hopi House (1905) was designed by Colter to resemble a Hopi pueblo. Located to the east of the El Tovar, between the hotel and Verkamp's Store, the multistory sandstone structure was built as a living museum in which Hopi artisans would demonstrate and sell their crafts. It is part of the Mary Jane Colter National Historic Landmark.
 The El Tovar Stables (1904) were built to house horses and mules used for transportation around the park in pre-automobile times, and continue to be used to house mules for the Bright Angel Trail to the Phantom Ranch. Individually listed on the NRHP
 The Kolb Brothers Studio (1904) was established by brothers Ellsworth and Emery Kolb, the studio featured the Kolbs' films and slide shows of the Grand Canyon in a building perched on and extending over the rim of the canyon at the head of the Bright Angel Trail. The building eventually extended to five stories and includes a small auditorium.
 Verkamp's Curio Store (1906), is now Verkamp's Visitor Center, operated by the National Park Service. Built by Ohioan John George Verkamp, who sold Indigenous crafts and souvenirs, the two-story shingled building has been described as "modified Mission" style, resembling an adobe building in form but not materials. Members of the Verkamp family lived upstairs through 1978. By 2008, when the store was the oldest concessioner in the national park system, the Verkamp family elected not to renew their concession. The store closed and the Park Service renovated the building as a visitor center.
 The Grand Canyon Power House was built by the AT&SF to provide electricity to concessioner and park facilities.  The power house is notable for its application of rustic design principles to an industrial structure and for its creative use of scale. It is an individually listed National Historic Landmark.
 The Grand Canyon Depot (1910) and Grand Canyon Railway (1905) were built by the AT&SF. The depot, designed by Francis W. Wilson, is an individually listed National Historical Landmark, and the railway is on the National Register of Historic Places.
 The AT&SF Employee residences were built to house concessioner employees.  Both the subdivision and the houses themselves are larger than the Park Service equivalent, with garages to the rear of the houses on alleys.

Park Service structures include:
 The Grand Canyon National Park Superintendent's Residence (1921) was originally the park's first headquarters building. It was designed in the National Park Service Rustic style by Hull, and altered in 1931 by Vint to be the superintendent's residence. The residence is individually listed on the NRHP.
 The Grand Canyon Park Operations Building (1929) replaced the first headquarters. Now the park's law enforcement center, it is individually listed as a National Historic Landmark.
 The Grand Canyon South Rim Ranger's Dormitory (1920) was built as a workers' dormitory, and was converted to house park rangers in 1927.  It is individually listed on the NRHP.
 The Park Service Employee residences (1924–1933) were built under the direction of Hull and Vint on cul-de-sacs, facing inward to a common pedestrian area.  The 16 houses were designed in the NPS Rustic style.

Other contributing buildings include dormitories, service shops, a jail, a firehouse, the park hospital, a post office and two schools. Non-contributing structures include the Thunderbird and Kachina lodges between the Bright Angel Lodge and the El Tovar.

Landmark designation
The village's initial listing on the National Register of Historic Places on November 20, 1975 included 39 buildings, then was expanded in 1982 to include the Bright Angel Lodge and an additional 25 buildings. The district was declared a National Historic Landmark District on February 18, 1987. On October 24, 1995 the district was again expanded to include the historic center of Grand Canyon Village. The present district includes 247 buildings, 55 landscape structures and three sites. The NRHP district differs from the NHL district by its inclusion of two non-contiguous cemeteries, not part of the NHL since they have no association with park architecture.

Try 1995 doc, did that expansion add Bright Angel Lodge.  There is 1982 NRHP listing of Grand Canyon Inn but that is on North Rim.

There is 1982 NRHP listing of Grand Canyon Inn but that is on North Rim.

Gallery

See also

 Architects of the National Park Service
 National Register of Historic Places listings in Grand Canyon National Park
 Rustic architecture in Arizona

References

External links
El Tovar Hotel, Architecture in the Parks
M. E. J. Colter Buildings, Architecture in the Parks
Grand Canyon Depot, Architecture in the Parks
Canyon Railway
Grand Canyon National Park Lodges
Grand Canyon Park Operations Building, Architecture in the Parks
El Tovar Hotel History, El Tovar History
Historic American Engineering Record (HAER) documentation, filed under Grand Canyon Village, Coconino County, AZ:

Grand Canyon
Grand Canyon, South Rim
Grand Canyon history
Grand Canyon National Park
Historic districts on the National Register of Historic Places in Arizona
Buildings and structures in Grand Canyon National Park
Park buildings and structures on the National Register of Historic Places in Arizona
National Register of Historic Places in Coconino County, Arizona
National Historic Landmarks in Arizona
Civilian Conservation Corps in Arizona
Historic American Engineering Record in Arizona
History of Coconino County, Arizona
National Park Service rustic in Arizona
National Register of Historic Places in Grand Canyon National Park